Tutong District (Jawi: دائيره توتوڠ) or simply Tutong is one of the four districts of Brunei. The administrative town is Pekan Tutong. It is home to Tasek Merimbun, the country's largest natural lake.

History 
Prior to the introduction of the British residential system in Brunei in 1906, Tutong was a  land, a type of land ownership in Brunei's traditional government. The district have seen a rapid rise in population by nearly 15,000 in 1967.

Geography 
The district borders the South China Sea to the north, Brunei-Muara District to the north-east, the Malaysian state of Sarawak to the east and south, and Belait District to the west.

The  Tutong River is the sole primary river and only flows in the district. It begins in the district's interior in the south and flows northwards which finally discharges into the South China Sea.

The district is home to Tasek Merimbun, the largest natural lake in Brunei. It is a designated ASEAN Heritage Park since 29 November 1984.

Administration 

Tutong District is administered by Tutong District Office, a government department under the Ministry of Home Affairs.

The district is divided into eight mukims:

 Mukim Keriam
 Mukim Kiudang
 Mukim Lamunin
 Mukim Pekan Tutong
 Mukim Rambai
 Mukim Tanjong Maya
 Mukim Telisai
 Mukim Ukong

Mukim Pekan Tutong encompasses the municipal area of Pekan Tutong.

According to the Constitution, the district is to be represented in the Legislative Council, the state legislature, by up to 3 members. As of 2017, two members have been appointed to represent the district in the legislature.

Demographics 

Tutong District is the third most populous district in Brunei. In terms of professed religions,  were Muslims,  were Christians,  were Buddhists, and  professed other than the aforementioned religions or irreligious.

The census also recorded 8,578 households living in 8,491 dwellings in the district.

In 2020, the district's population was estimated to have increased to 51,500.

The main ethnic groups in the district consist of Tutong, Dusun, Kedayan, Iban and Chinese.

Healthcare 

Healthcare in the district began with the establishment of a medical clinic in 1932 in Bukit Bendera area near the district town Pekan Tutong. During the Japanese occupation of Brunei (1941–1945), the clinic building suffered great damage due to bombing.

In late 1972, the construction of Tutong District Hospital was completed. It could accommodate 20 beds; healthcare services included surgery room, delivery room, x-ray, dental clinic, outpatient and medical laboratory.

The current district hospital is Pengiran Muda Mahkota Pengiran Muda Haji Al-Muhtadee Billah (PMMPMHAMB) Hospital which replaced the former Tutong District Hospital. As of today, it is the sole hospital in the district.

There are also four community health centres located in Pekan Tutong, Kampong Sungai Kelugos, Kampong Telisai and Kampong Lamunin. The health centres mainly provide outpatient care to the residents of the village or mukim where they are located, as well as those that live in the surrounding areas.

National Isolation Centre 

Tutong District is home to the National Isolation Centre (NIC), the country's dedicated medical isolation facility for communicable diseases. Located in a permanent building beside the district hospital, it was inaugurated by the Crown Prince Al-Muhtadee Billah on 13 November 2012 at a cost of B$8.47 million (US$6.26 million as of September 2021); it can accommodate 136 beds. It is playing a vital role in the COVID-19 situation in Brunei, whereby it is where COVID-19 patients are isolated and treated. A new extension was built in 2020 in the event the existing facility reached full capacity. The construction was completed in three weeks at a cost of B$11 million (US$8.1 million as of September 2021); it can accommodate additional 160 beds. During the COVID-19 outbreak, the adjacent PMMPMHAMB Hospital has also been converted into another extension for the isolation centre.

Education 

In 2019, there were 42 schools in Tutong District under the Ministry of Education, out of which 36 were government and 6 were private. For the formal Islamic religious education which is under the Ministry of Religious Affairs, there were 30 religious schools ( of the country's total), employing 327 teachers and enrolling 4,102 students.

Education in the district is available up to sixth form, which is provided at Tutong Sixth Form Centre, the sole sixth form college in the district.

Government schools 
The government schools are mainly administered under the Ministry of Education. There are 30 primary schools, 5 secondary schools and one sixth form college in the district, which are grouped under Cluster 6 of the Ministry's school administrative district.

The five secondary schools are:
 Muda Hashim Secondary School;
 Raja Isteri Pengiran Anak Saleha Secondary School;
 Sayyidina 'Othman Secondary School;
 Sufri Bolkiah Secondary School; and
 Tanjong Maya Secondary School.
These schools offer secondary education that leads to Brunei-Cambridge GCE O Level.

The sole sixth form college of the district is the Tutong Sixth Form Centre and offers sixth form education which leads to GCE A Level.

Ma'had Islam Brunei is the only government school in the district which is not administered by the Ministry of Education.

Transportation 

Places of interest 
Tutong has the largest lake in Brunei, Tasek Merimbun, which surrounds the Tasek Merimbun Heritage Park. Other places of interest in Tutong include
 Sungai Basong Recreation Park
 Seri Kenangan Beach

References

External links 

 Tutong District Office website

 
Districts of Brunei